Jesse Boot (18 March 1860 – 1 March 1940) was an English cricketer who played first-class cricket for Derbyshire in 1895.

He appeared for Derbyshire in the 1885 season when he kept wicket in a match against Staffordshire which did not count as first-class. His only first-class appearance for Derbyshire came late the 1895 season, against Leicestershire in August. A middle-order batsman, he scored a duck in his first innings and just four runs in the next. He did not play for the side again.

Boot was a right-handed batsman and scored 4 runs in his first-class career. He was also a wicket-keeper, but not in the first-class game.

Boot died in Chesterfield just short of 80 years.

References

1860 births
1940 deaths
English cricketers
Derbyshire cricketers
People from South Normanton
Cricketers from Derbyshire